†Partula fusca was a species of air-breathing tropical land snail, a terrestrial pulmonate gastropod mollusc in the family Partulidae. This species was endemic to French Polynesia. It is now extinct.

References

F
Extinct gastropods
Extinct animals of Oceania
Fauna of French Polynesia
Molluscs of Oceania
Molluscs of the Pacific Ocean
Gastropods described in 1867
Taxobox binomials not recognized by IUCN